Gault Wood is a woodland in Cambridgeshire, England, near the town of March. It is owned and managed by the Woodland Trust.

References

Forests and woodlands of Cambridgeshire